The Coleman Medal is an Australian rules football award given annually to the Australian Football League (AFL) player who kicks the most goals in the home-and-away season. It is named after Essendon full-forward John Coleman, one of the most prolific goalkickers in the league's history, who was league leading goalkicker for five consecutive seasons.

The medal has been presented at various different events, including the preliminary and grand finals, the All-Australian awards ceremony, and club award ceremonies. Carlton's Charlie Curnow is the most recent recipient, kicking 64 goals in 2022.

History
The award was first presented in 1981 to Richmond's Michael Roach; At the time, the competition was known as the Victorian Football League (VFL); it would become the AFL in 1990. It was named after John Coleman, a full-forward and Australian Football Hall of Fame Legend who scored 537 goals in 98 games for Essendon between 1949 and 1954.

In September 2001, the AFL decided to recognise all leading goalkickers prior to Roach's victory; leaders from 1955—the year after Coleman's last match—to 1980 were named retrospective Coleman Medallists, while winners prior to 1955 were named Leading Goalkicker Medallists. Medals were presented to winners or their surviving relatives in a ceremony at Melbourne Town Hall in July 2004. Jack Collins, who had been a leading advocate for naming the award after Coleman and honouring leading goalkickers prior to 1981, was the only player to receive both a Coleman and a Leading Goalkicker Medal. Upon receiving the accolades, he was "bloody angry" and complained to the AFL Commission, as he perceived the Leading Goalkicker Medal to be an inferior award.

Collingwood is the club most frequently represented by Coleman and Leading Goalkicker Medallists: its players have won on 23 occasions, six clear of Geelong's tally of 17. The majority of Collingwood's awards were contributed by Dick Lee (7) and Gordon Coventry (6), which stand as the most and second-most in league history. Coleman himself won the Leading Goalkicker Medals in all five of his complete VFL seasons to have the third-most. As of 2021, there have been five four-time medallists, five three-time medallists, and 15 dual medallists.

Recipients

Multiple recipients

Club totals

See also
AFL Women's leading goalkicker
Ken Farmer Medal – equivalent award in the South Australian National Football League
Jim 'Frosty' Miller Medal – equivalent award in the Victorian Football League
Bernie Naylor Medal – equivalent award in the West Australian Football League

Notes

References

Australian Football League awards
Awards established in 1981
1981 establishments in Australia
Australian rules football-related lists